The Bank of Montreal Building was a 16-storey office tower located at the northwest corner of King Street and Bay Street in Toronto, Ontario. It was the secondary headquarters of the Bank of Montreal after its head office in Montreal. Architects Chapman and Oxley designed the building in 1938 and construction began that same year. After the outbreak of World War II in September 1939, construction halted with only three storeys completed. Following the War, the design was revised, construction resumed, and the building opened in 1948. The Bank of Montreal Building stood only 27 years before being demolished in 1975.

History and design 
In 1938, the Bank of Montreal hired Toronto architecture firm Chapman and Oxley to design a new office tower. The design was to include four floors for the bank and 12 floors of rentable offices above. Construction began in 1938, but upon the outbreak of war in September 1939, halted with only three floors complete. The remainder of the steel had been fabricated and stayed in storage during the War. Following the cessation of hostilities, the Bank elected to proceed with construction, albeit with several alterations to the original plan. During the war, Alfred Chapman had become ill, and thus Marani and Morris joined original firm (which had become Chapman Oxley and Facey). Associate architect K. R. Blatherwick also joined the design team. Construction began again in 1946 and concluded in 1948.

The building extended 94 feet on King Street and 152 feet on Bay Street. It was finished in Queenston limestone with a seven-foot base of silver grey granite. The first floor held the banking hall; the second floor held the board room, men's and women's lounges, and dining rooms; and the third floor held bank offices. Along Bay Street the building was set back 10 feet above the third floor, and set back again above the 14th floor.

The Bank of Montreal building was one of four banking head offices located at the corner of King and Bay, the others being the Bank of Toronto Building (Carrère and Hastings, 1911), the Imperial Bank Building (Sproatt and Rolph, 1934), and the Bank of Nova Scotia Building (Mathers and Haldenby). The intersection of King and Bay acquired the nickname "MINT corner" for Montreal, Imperial, Nova Scotia, and Toronto.

In 1975 the Bank of Montreal demolished the building to make way for its new First Canadian Place. Upon completion in 1977, the Bank of Montreal moved its headquarters from Montreal to the new tower in Toronto.

References 

Bank of Montreal
Buildings and structures in Toronto
Demolished buildings and structures in Toronto
Historic bank buildings in Canada
Buildings and structures demolished in 1975
Office buildings completed in 1948